The 2022–23 season is the 131st season in the existence of SK Slavia Prague and the club's 30th consecutive season in the top flight of Czech football.

Season events
On 28 July, Matěj Jurásek signed a new four-year contract with Slavia, keeping him at the club until the summer of 2026.

Transfers
On 4 June, Slavia announced the signing of Václav Jurečka from Slovácko, on a three-year contract.

On 11 June, Slavia announced the signing of Eduardo Santos from MFK Karviná, on a four-year contract.

On 17 June, Slavia announced the signing of Ewerton from Mladá Boleslav, on a three-year contract.

On 20 June, Slavia announced the signing of Denis Halinsky from Viagem Příbram, on a three-year contract.

On 2 July, Matěj Valenta returned to Slavia, signing on a four-year contract from Dynamo České Budějovice.

On 15 July, Christ Tiéhi joined Slavia on loan until the winter transfer window.

On 31 August, Slavia announced the signing of Ebrima Singhateh from Paide Linnameeskond on a contract until June 2027.

On 8 September, Srđan Plavšić joined Baník Ostrava on a season-long loan deal.

On 9 December, Slavia announced the signing of Petr Hronek from Bohemians 1905 on a contract until 2025.

On 30 December, Slavia announced that Yira Sor had joined Genk.

On 4 January, Slavia announced the signing of David Pech from Mladá Boleslav on a contract until June 2027.

On 7 January, Slavia announced the signing of Igoh Ogbu from Lillestrøm on a contract until 31 December 2026, with Babacar Sy joining on 9 January on a contract until 30 June 2026 from Silon Táborsko.

On 18 January, Moses Usor joined LASK on loan for the remainder of the season.

On 7 January, Slavia announced the signing of Christos Zafeiris from Haugesund on a contract until 30 June 2027.

Squad

Out on loan

Transfers

In

Loans in

Out

Loans out

Released

Friendlies

Competitions

Overall record

Czech First League

Regular season

League table

Results summary

Results by round

Results

Czech Cup

UEFA Europa Conference League

Qualifying phase

Group stage

Squad statistics

Appearances and goals

|-
|colspan="16"|Slavia Prague B Players:

|-
|colspan="16"|Players away from Slavia Prague on loan:

|-
|colspan="16"|Players who left Slavia Prague during the season:

|}

Goal scorers

Clean sheets

Disciplinary record

References

External links
Official website

Slavia Prague
SK Slavia Prague seasons
Czech Republic football clubs 2022–23 season